Lasionycta hospita is a moth of the family Noctuidae. It is found in the South Siberian Mountains and the Amur and Primorye regions

External links
Checklist of Hadeninae of Russia

Lasionycta
Moths described in 1912